The Minimumweight competition at the 2023 IBA Women's World Boxing Championships will be held between 18 and 25 March 2023.

Results

Finals

Top half

Section 1

Section 2

Bottom half

Section 3

Section 4

References

External links
Draw

Minimumweight